Thabani Jehiel Tawana Maguranyanga, (born 22 December 2002) commonly known as TJ Maguranyanga is a Zimbabwean professional player for ASM Clermont Auvergne in the French Top 14.  He was a member of the Golden Lions Under-18 Craven Week team in 2019.

Rugby career 
Maguranyanga represented Zimbabwe at the Under-13 Craven Week in 2015. He went on to represent the Golden Lions at national youth competitions, playing in the Under-16 Grant Khomo Week in 2018 and Under-18 Craven Week in 2019. In 2019 he represented Zimbabwe Under-18 Sevens side at the Capricorn Group International Junior Sevens Tournament in Windhoek, Namibia. He was selected as captain for 2020.

References 

Zimbabwean rugby union players
2002 births
Living people